The 16th Canadian Parliament was in session from 9 December 1926, until 30 May 1930. The membership was set by the 1926 federal election on 14 September 1926, and it changed only somewhat due to resignations and by-elections until it was dissolved prior to the 1930 election.

It was controlled by a Liberal Party minority under Prime Minister William Lyon Mackenzie King and the 14th Canadian Ministry.  The Official Opposition was the Conservative Party, led briefly by Hugh Guthrie, and then by Richard Bedford Bennett.

The Speaker was Rodolphe Lemieux.  See also List of Canadian electoral districts 1924-1933 for a list of the ridings in this parliament.

There were four sessions of the 16th Parliament:

List of members

Following is a full list of members of the sixteenth Parliament listed first by province, then by electoral district.

Electoral districts denoted by an asterisk (*) indicates that district was represented by two members.

Alberta

British Columbia

Manitoba

New Brunswick

Nova Scotia

Ontario

Prince Edward Island

Quebec

Saskatchewan

Yukon

By-elections

References

Succession

Canadian parliaments
1926 establishments in Canada
1930 disestablishments in Canada
1926 in Canada
1927 in Canada
1928 in Canada
1929 in Canada
1930 in Canada